In Greek mythology, the name Amphius (Ancient Greek: Ἅμφιος) refers to two defenders of Troy:

 Amphius, son of Merops of Percote. Disregarding their father's advice, he and his brother Adrastus joined in the Trojan War and were killed by Diomedes.
 Amphius, son of Selagus, from Paesus. He was killed by Ajax the Great.

Eponym 
 37519 Amphios, Jovian asteroid

Notes

References 

 Homer, The Iliad with an English Translation by A.T. Murray, Ph.D. in two volumes. Cambridge, MA., Harvard University Press; London, William Heinemann, Ltd. 1924. . Online version at the Perseus Digital Library.
 Homer, Homeri Opera in five volumes. Oxford, Oxford University Press. 1920. . Greek text available at the Perseus Digital Library.

Trojans